"We're Going to Ibiza!" is a song by Dutch Eurodance group Vengaboys. It was released in March 1999 as the second and final single from their second studio album, The Party Album (1999). Based on Typically Tropical's 1975 number-one hit "Barbados", the song reached number one on the UK Singles Chart in September 1999, becoming the group's second number-one single there. Outside the UK, the song also reached number one in the band's native Netherlands and became a top-five hit in Flanders, Norway, and Sweden.

Content

Critical reception
Jim Wirth from NME commented, "Who better than the peerless Vengaboys to soundtrack this moment of pure spiritual tranquillity with a spot of ersatz reggae?" The Daily Record stated that the 1975 number-one hit, "We're Going To Barbados, "has been reworked and renamed. Cheesier than a Quattro Formaggio pizza." Pop Rescue wrote that the song "isn’t half as clubby as their previous singles", adding that "Kim’s vocals are pretty good here apart from where she has to reach a high note, which is a bit wobbly on the way up to. Robin and Roy hold back for some 'woah!' vocals only."

Popularity in Austria
After the revelation of the Ibiza affair in May 2019, which caused the resignation of Austrian Vice-Chancellor Heinz-Christian Strache, demonstrators in Vienna used the song as a protest song. As a consequence, the song re-entered the Austrian singles chart and eventually reached number 16.

Music video
The animated music video for the song features the Vengaboys travelling to Ibiza via a circuitous route that takes them all across the world. In the Washington D.C. part, a man and a woman silhouetted in a window of the Capitol building are having sex, a reference to the Clinton–Lewinsky scandal.

Track listings

 Dutch CD1
 "We're Going to Ibiza!" (Hitradio Mix)
 "We're Going to Ibiza!" (DJ Peran Remix)
 "We Like to Party!" (Jason Nevins club mix)
 "We Like to Party!" (Tin Tin Out Remix)
 "We Like to Party!" (Klubbheads Remix)
 "We Like to Party!" (Jason Nevins dub mix)

 Dutch CD2
 "We're Going to Ibiza!" (Hitradio Mix)
 "We Like to Party!" (Jason Nevins club mix)

 UK CD1
 "We're Going to Ibiza!" (Hitradio Mix) – 3:36
 "We're Going to Ibiza!" (Hitclub extended remix) – 5:07
 "Vengaboys Megamix" – 5:47
 "We're Going to Ibiza!" (video)

 UK CD2
 "We're Going to Ibiza!" (Hitradio Mix) – 3:36
 "We're Going to Ibiza!" (DJ Peran Remix) – 6:40
 "Paradise" (DJ Jam X & De Leon's DuMonde Mix)

 UK cassette single
 "We're Going to Ibiza!" (Hitradio Mix) – 3:36
 "We're Going to Ibiza!" (Hitclub extended remix) – 5:07
 "Vengaboys Megamix" – 5:47

 Australian CD single
 "We're Going to Ibiza!" (Hitradio Mix) – 3:40
 "We're Going to Ibiza!" (Hitclub Airplay) – 3:25
 "We're Going to Ibiza!" (DJ Peran Remix) – 6:44
 "We're Going to Ibiza!" (Hitclub extended remix) – 5:08
 "Paradise" (DJ Jam X & De Leon's DuMonde Mix) – 8:38
 "We're Going to Ibiza!" (video)

Charts and certifications

Weekly charts

Year-end charts

Certifications

Release history

References

Vengaboys songs
1999 singles
1999 songs
Animated music videos
Dutch Top 40 number-one singles
English-language Dutch songs
Number-one singles in Scotland
Positiva Records singles
Reggae songs
Songs about Ibiza
UK Singles Chart number-one singles